Firuzoba (formerly Ghafurjon Ortiqov) is a town and jamoat in north-western Tajikistan. It is part of the city of Konibodom in Sughd Region. The jamoat has a total population of 23,813 (2015).

References

Populated places in Sughd Region
Jamoats of Tajikistan